MARCKS-related protein is a protein that in humans is encoded by the MARCKSL1 gene.

Function 

This gene encodes a member of the myristoylated alanine-rich C-kinase substrate (MARCKS) family. MARCKS play a role in cytoskeletal regulation, protein kinase C signaling and calmodulin signaling. The encoded protein affects the formation of adherens junction. Alternative splicing results in multiple transcript variants.

Interactions 

MARCKSL1 has been shown to interact with DCTN2 and JNK.

References

Further reading